The Philippine House Committee on Overseas Workers Affairs, or House Overseas Workers Affairs Committee is a standing committee of the Philippine House of Representatives.

Jurisdiction 
As prescribed by House Rules, the committee's jurisdiction is on the policies and programs which promote and protect the rights and welfare of Overseas Filipino Workers (OFWs) including their families.

Members, 19th Congress

Historical members

18th Congress

Member for the Majority 
 Nestor Fongwan (Benguet–Lone, PDP–Laban)

See also
 House of Representatives of the Philippines
 List of Philippine House of Representatives committees
 Overseas Workers Welfare Administration
 Philippine Overseas Employment Administration

Notes

References

External links 
House of Representatives of the Philippines

Overseas
Overseas Filipino Worker